Tragic Story with Happy Ending (French: Histoire tragique avec fin heureuse) is a 2005 animated short by Regina Pessoa. To make the 7 minute 43 second film, Pessoa's drawings were transferred to glossy paper, brushed with India ink, scratched with a blade to give the effect of an engraving, then photographed. National Film Board of Canada film composer Normand Roger supplied the score for the film.

The film was the second in a trilogy of animated shorts by Pessoa about childhood, between A Noite (1999)  and Kali the Little Vampire.

Reception
Tragic Story with Happy Ending has received numerous awards, becoming one of Portugal's most acclaimed animated films. They include the Cristal and TPS Cineculte awards for short film at the Annecy International Animated Film Festival, a special international jury prize at the Hiroshima International Animation Festival, and a Genie Award nomination for Best Animated Short Film at the 28th Genie Awards.

References

External links

Tragic Story with Happy Ending at Ciclope Films
Watch Tragic Story with Happy Ending at NFB.ca

Portuguese animated short films
2005 short films
2005 animated films
2005 films
National Film Board of Canada animated short films
2000s animated short films
French animated short films
Films directed by Regina Pessoa
Folimage films
2000s French animated films
Canadian animated short films
2000s Canadian films